Mount McMaster is an outcrop  above sea level, located about  northeast of Mount Pardoe and  west of Mount Elkins in Enderby Land, East Antarctica. The outcrop was named after A. McMaster, a surveyor with the Australian National Antarctic Research Expeditions Enderby Land Survey Party in 1976 who established a survey station on the summit.

See also 
List of mountains of Enderby Land

References

External links 
 Australian Antarctic Names and Medals Committee (AANMC)

Mountains of Enderby Land